Elliptio nigella, the winged spike or recovery pearly mussel, is a species of freshwater mussel, an aquatic bivalve mollusk in the family Unionidae, the river mussels.

This species is endemic to the United States. It was thought to be extinct, but was rediscovered in 2010. It is not known if the rediscovered population is viable.

References

nigella
Bivalves described in 1852
Taxonomy articles created by Polbot